Death Spells was an American digital hardcore band formed in 2012. The group was composed of My Chemical Romance rhythm guitarist Frank Iero and keyboardist James Dewees (also of The Get Up Kids and Reggie and the Full Effect), who were both members of hardcore punk band Leathermouth as well.

History
Frank Iero and James Dewees were sharing an apartment in North Hollywood, Los Angeles in 2012 while My Chemical Romance was writing and recording in studio. The project originally came to fruition when Iero and Dewees snuck equipment out of the studio so they could mess around with it and were "trying to blow up each other's speakers." The seediness of the area they were located in was a huge influence to the music, with the pair aiming to get "as grimly as humanely possible" without getting kicked out of the apartment.

In 2013, after My Chemical Romance disbanded, Death Spells started touring. This included a support slot on Mindless Self Indulgence's East Coast US tour as well as playing Skate And Surf festival. Starting a week before the Mindless Self Indulgence tour, Death Spells posted a short demo of a new song each night at midnight, culminating this with their first full single "Where Are My Fucking Pills?" and an accompanying music video. A full-length album was expected to be released in late 2013, however this never happened due to them moving onto other projects. The band supported The Architects in three shows in late 2013 and released a limited cassette release available at those shows.

Death Spells released their debut studio album "Nothing Above, Nothing Below" on July 29, 2016. Following the release of the album, Iero and Dewees went on a small headlining tour with four dates in the UK, one date in Moscow, and two dates in the United States. The band performed at Riot Fest in Denver and Chicago in September 2016. It was announced that they played be played two shows with Iero's solo project, frnkiero and the patience, on the days immediately before and after their Riot Fest Chicago performances.

Members
Current members
 Frank Iero – lead vocals, programming (2012–13, 2016)
 James Dewees – programming, keyboards (2012–13, 2016)

Discography

EPs
Choke On One Another / Sunday Came Undone (2013)

Studio albums
Nothing Above, Nothing Below (2016)

References

External links 
 

Musical groups established in 2012
American electronic music groups
2012 establishments in New Jersey